The 58th Baeksang Arts Awards ceremony, organised by Ilgan Sports and JTBC Plus, was held on May 6, 2022, at KINTEX, Ilsanseo-gu, Gyeonggi Province, beginning at 7:45 p.m. KST. The event was hosted by Shin Dong-yup, Bae Suzy and Park Bo-gum and was broadcast live in South Korea by JTBC and internationally by TikTok. For the first time in two years, it was held with an on-site audience. The annual awards ceremony is one of South Korea's most prestigious award shows, recognizing excellence in film, television, and theatre.

The nominees were announced on April 11, 2022 via its official website. All works released between April 12, 2021, and March 31, 2022, were eligible for nominations. The final candidates for Grand Prize – Film were film Escape from Mogadishu and its director Ryoo Seung-wan.

The highest honors of the night, Grand Prize (Daesang), were awarded to director Ryoo Seung-wan of Escape from Mogadishu in the film division and drama Squid Game in the television division. Escape from Mogadishu and Kingmaker were the most winning films with three awards each, while D.P. and Squid Game also had the most wins of three in the television division. Lee Jun-ho and Kim Tae-ri became the most awarded individuals of the night; Lee won awards for Best Actor – Television and Most Popular Actor for The Red Sleeve while Kim won Best Actress – Television and Most Popular Actress for Twenty-Five Twenty-One.

Winners and nominees 
 Winners will be listed first and emphasized in bold.
 Nominees

Film

Films with multiple wins 
The following films received multiple wins:

Films with multiple nominations 
The following films received multiple nominations:

Television

Television programs with multiple wins 
The following television programs received multiple wins:

Television programs with multiple nominations 
The following television programs received multiple nominations:

Theatre

Special awards 
The voting for the TikTok Popularity Award was held from 11:00 a.m. KST on 22 April to 6:00 p.m. KST on 29 April via TikTok.

Presenters and performers 
The following individuals and teams, listed in order of appearance, presented awards or performed musical numbers.

Presenters

Performers

Notes

References

External links 
  

Baeksang
Baeksang
Baeksang Arts Awards
Baek
Baek
2022 in South Korea
May 2022 events in Asia